The Gen. Joseph Arrington House (also known as the Lewis House and Little Falls Plantation) is a historic plantation house located near Hilliardston, Nash County, North Carolina.

Description and history 
It consists of two sections: a one-story, two bay, frame section with a Georgian style interior and a two-story, three bay, frame section with vernacular Federal style interiors. It sits on a brick cellar and has gable roofs on both sections. The two-story section features two double-shoulder, brick exterior end chimneys.

It was listed on the National Register of Historic Places on July 15, 1974.

References

Plantation houses in North Carolina
Houses on the National Register of Historic Places in North Carolina
Georgian architecture in North Carolina
Federal architecture in North Carolina
Houses in Nash County, North Carolina
National Register of Historic Places in Nash County, North Carolina